The 1969 Humboldt State Lumberjacks football team represented Humboldt State College during the 1969 NCAA College Division football season. Humboldt State competed in the Far Western Conference (FWC).

The 1969 Lumberjacks were led by fourth-year head coach Bud Van Deren. They played home games at the Redwood Bowl in Arcata, California. Humboldt State finished with a record of six wins and four losses (6–4, 2–3 FWC). The Lumberjacks outscored their opponents 267–158 for the season.

Schedule

Team players in the NFL
The following Humboldt State players were selected in the 1970 NFL Draft.

Notes

References

Humboldt State
Humboldt State Lumberjacks football seasons
Humboldt State Lumberjacks football